Torslandavallen  is a football stadium in Torslanda, Sweden  and the home stadium for the football team Torslanda IK. Torslandavallen has a total capacity of 1,500 spectators.

References 

Football venues in Sweden